Stephanie Weirich is an American computer scientist specializing in type theory, type inference, dependent types, and functional programming. She is a professor of computer science at the University of Pennsylvania.

Weirich graduated magna cum laude in 1996 from Rice University, with a bachelor's degree in computer science. At Rice, she became interested in programming languages through an undergraduate research project with Matthias Felleisen. She moved to Cornell University for her graduate studies, completing her Ph.D. in 2002. Her dissertation, Programming with Types, was supervised by Greg Morrisett. She joined the University of Pennsylvania faculty in 2002.

Weirich's work on type inference has been incorporated into the Glasgow Haskell Compiler. She has also been a leader of the POPLmark challenge for benchmarking type systems of programming languages. Weirich won the Robin Milner Young Researcher Award of ACM SIGPLAN in 2016.

References

External links
Home page

Year of birth missing (living people)
Living people
American computer scientists
American women computer scientists
Programming language researchers
Rice University alumni
Cornell University alumni
University of Pennsylvania faculty
American women academics
21st-century American women